Metalamia is a genus of longhorn beetles of the subfamily Lamiinae, containing the following species:

 Metalamia cuprea Breuning, 1940
 Metalamia obtusipennis (Bates, 1876)

References

Desmiphorini